Farmington is a town in Marion County, West Virginia, United States. The population was 389 at the 2020 census. The small town is situated on Buffalo Creek and the Allegheny Mountains about 6 miles west of Fairmont, Marion County's county seat. It is best known for being the site of the 1968 Farmington Mine disaster.

History
The community was named for the fact a large share of the first settlers were farmers. The area was first settled by James Goodin in the late 1700s, by Nicholas Wood and family, and by Jacob Straight and family in the 1770s. A later settler, Joseph Morgan, would build a mill here in 1801. The area would later be incorporated in Marion County as the town of Farmington in 1896, but was earlier known as Willeyvile, Willeytown, and Underwood. While it was officially named Farmington in 1896, when the Baltimore and Ohio Railroad ran through the town its stations there went under the name Underwood because of there being many towns of the same name. The town was also home to mines Number 08 of Jamison Coal and Coke Company (exploded in 1926 and then sealed in the 1940s) and Number 09 of Consolidated Coal Company (exploded in 1954 and 1968, then sealed in 1978), to the Farmington High School "Farmers" and the North Marion High School Huskies, and to several small family businesses that run to present day.

Geography
Farmington is located at  (39.512979, -80.252060), along Buffalo Creek.

Demographics

2010 census
As of the census of 2010, there were 375 people, 163 households, and 111 families living in the town. The racial makeup of the town was 97.9% White, 0.3% Asian, and 1.9% from two or more races. Hispanic or Latino of any race were 0.3% of the population.

There were 163 households, of which 30.7% had children under the age of 18 living with them, 51.5% were married couples living together, 9.8% had a female householder with no husband present, 6.7% had a male householder with no wife present, and 31.9% were non-families. 28.8% of all households were made up of individuals, and 13.5% had someone living alone who was 65 years of age or older. The average household size was 2.30 and the average family size was 2.80.

The median age in the town was 39.6 years. 21.9% of residents were under the age of 18; 5.2% were between the ages of 18 and 24; 31.4% were from 25 to 44; 24.3% were from 45 to 64; and 17.1% were 65 years of age or older. The gender makeup of the town was 49.9% male and 50.1% female.

2000 census
As of the census of 2000, there were 387 people, 163 households, and 108 families living in the town. The population density was 917.3 inhabitants per square mile (355.8/km2). There were 194 housing units at an average density of 459.8 per square mile (178.3/km2). The racial makeup of the town was 96.90% White, 1.81% African American, and 1.29% from two or more races.

There were 163 households, out of which 26.4% had children under the age of 18 living with them, 42.9% were married couples living together, 17.2% had a female householder with no husband present, and 33.7% were non-families. 30.1% of all households were made up of individuals, and 19.0% had someone living alone who was 65 years of age or older. The average household size was 2.37 and the average family size was 2.93.

In the town, the population was spread out, with 23.5% under the age of 18, 7.0% from 18 to 24, 27.4% from 25 to 44, 23.0% from 45 to 64, and 19.1% who were 65 years of age or older. The median age was 37 years. For every 100 females, there were 85.2 males. For every 100 females age 18 and over, there were 81.6 males.

The median income for a household in the town was $29,375, and the median income for a family was $39,688. Males had a median income of $31,250 versus $18,750 for females. The per capita income for the town was $15,990. About 5.9% of families and 9.0% of the population were below the poverty line, including 17.3% of those under age 18 and 1.3% of those age 65 or over.

Notable people 
 Waitman T. Willey, was born in a log cabin near Farmington
 Frank Gatski, athlete in the Pro Football Hall of Fame
 Joe Manchin, U.S. Senator
 Sam Huff, Pro Football Hall of Fame

See also 
 Other Farmingtons
 Fairmont Marion County Transit Authority

References

External links
 Mine Disaster

Towns in Marion County, West Virginia
Towns in West Virginia
Coal towns in West Virginia